Leif Högström (born July 4, 1955) is a Swedish fencer and Olympic Champion. He competed at the 1976 Summer Olympics in Montreal, where he won a gold medal in épée with the Swedish team.

References

1955 births
Living people
Sportspeople from Stockholm
Swedish male épée fencers
Olympic fencers of Sweden
Fencers at the 1976 Summer Olympics
Fencers at the 1980 Summer Olympics
Olympic gold medalists for Sweden
Olympic medalists in fencing
Medalists at the 1976 Summer Olympics
20th-century Swedish people
Djurgårdens IF fencers